Darrell E. Wardien  (January 14, 1924 – October 6, 2007) was a Canadian football player who played for the Calgary Stampeders and Saskatchewan Roughriders. He played college football at the University of Montana, in the United States. In 1991 he was included on the Saskatchewan Roughriders' Plaza of Honour.

References

1924 births
Saskatchewan Roughriders players
2007 deaths